Parker McKenna Posey (born August 18, 1995) is an American actress. She is known for her role as Kady Kyle on the television show, My Wife and Kids.

Early life 
Posey was born on August 18, 1995, to Polo Posey and Heather Stone.

Career 
Posey rose to fame at a young age as she portrayed the role of Kady Kyle in the American sitcom, My Wife and Kids. Posey also stars in an American drama television series, Games People Play. She joined the cast of A House Divided in its second season as she played the role of Summer.

She has been present in a number of music videos including; Grammy-nominated "Beautiful Lies" by Yung Bleu and "Sweet Sweet Baby" by Macy Gray.

Personal life 
In 2018, Parker's ex-boyfriend, Chris Sails was arrested for assaulting her.

In May 2021, Parker shared a video on her Instagram profile where she revealed that she has just given birth to a baby girl, Harley.

References

External links 

1995 births
African-American actresses
American actresses
Living people